The rulers  of Japan have been its Emperors, whether effectively or nominally, for its entire recorded history. These include the ancient legendary emperors, the attested but undated emperors of the Yamato period (early fifth to early 6th centuries), and the clearly dated emperors of 539 to the present. Political power was held in various eras by regents and shōguns, and since 1946 has been exercised exclusively by the Prime Minister as leader of a representative government.

See also

 Sessho and Kampaku
 History of Japan
 Lists of incumbents

Politics of Japan
Japan
Rulers